The 1905 Columbia Blue and White football team was an American football team that represented Columbia University as an independent during the 1905 college football season. The team's three losses were to undefeated national champion Yale, undefeated Penn, and Princeton. John R. Fisher was the team captain.

Columbia's sports teams were commonly called the "Blue and White" in this era, but had no official nickname. The name "Lions" would not be adopted until 1910.

The team played its home games at the American League Park, a baseball park in the Washington Heights neighborhood of Upper Manhattan in New York City, and also the home field of the New York Yankees.

Schedule

References

Columbia
Columbia Lions football seasons
Columbia Blue and White football